Acanthepeira is a genus of orb-weaver spiders first described by George Marx in 1883.

Species
 it contains five species:
Acanthepeira cherokee Levi, 1976 – USA
Acanthepeira labidura (Mello-Leitão, 1943) – Brazil
Acanthepeira marion Levi, 1976 – USA, Mexico
Acanthepeira stellata (Walckenaer, 1805) – Canada to Mexico
Acanthepeira venusta (Banks, 1896) – USA, Cuba, Hispaniola

References

Araneidae
Araneomorphae genera
Spiders of Brazil
Spiders of North America